The Fieseler Fi 158 was a civilian research aircraft designed and built in Germany from 1938.

Design and development
Designed as a manned version of the Fi 157 radio-controlled drone, the Fi 158 was a low-winged monoplane built largely of wood, with retractable tailwheel undercarriage and twin fins and rudders, with the crew sat in tandem in an enclosed cabin. Limited flight testing was carried out before the prototype was destroyed in an air raid.

Specifications (Fi 158 V1)

References

Notes

Bibliography
 Nowarra Heinz J.:Die Deutsche Luftrüstung 1933-1945, Bernard & Graeffe Verlag, Koblenz 1993, 

1930s German experimental aircraft
Fi 158
Low-wing aircraft
Single-engined tractor aircraft
Aircraft first flown in 1938